The English women's cricket team toured Australia and New Zealand between January and March 2008. In Australia, they were defending the Women's Ashes. The sides won 2 ODIs apiece, while Australia won the T20 match. The only Test match played was won by England, who thus defended the Women's Ashes. In New Zealand, the two teams played a five match ODI series, which was won by England, 3–1.

Tour of Australia

Squads

Tour matches

50-over match: Victoria v England

50-over match: Australia Under-21s v England

50-over match: Australia Under-21s v England

Only WT20I

WODI Series

1st ODI

2nd ODI

3rd ODI

4th ODI

5th ODI

Test Match

Tour of New Zealand

Squads

Tour matches

50-over match: New Zealand A v England

WODI Series

1st ODI

2nd ODI

3rd ODI

4th ODI

5th ODI

References

External links
England Women tour of Australia and New Zealand 2007/08 from Cricinfo

International cricket competitions in 2008
The Women's Ashes
2007–08 Australian women's cricket season
Australia and New Zealand 2008
Women's international cricket tours of Australia
Women's international cricket tours of New Zealand
2008 in women's cricket